This is a list of all personnel changes for the 1950 NBA off-season and 1950–51 NBA season.

Events

August ?, 1950
The Baltimore Bullets signed Billy Hassett as a free agent.

August 10, 1950
The New York Knicks traded Paul Noel to the Rochester Royals for Ray Ellefson.

September 23, 1950
The Sheboygan Red Skins sold Bob Brannum to the Boston Celtics.
The Rochester Royals signed Odie Spears as a free agent.

October ?, 1950
The Baltimore Bullets signed Ray Corley as a free agent.

October 5, 1950
The Fort Wayne Pistons selected Larry Foust from the Chicago Stags in the dispersal draft.
The Washington Capitols selected Frank Kudelka from the Chicago Stags in the dispersal draft.
The Washington Capitols selected Joe Bradley from the Chicago Stags in the dispersal draft.
The Tri-Cities Blackhawks selected Kleggie Hermsen from the Chicago Stags in the dispersal draft.
The New York Knicks selected Max Zaslofsky from the Chicago Stags in the dispersal draft.
The Boston Celtics selected Bob Cousy from the Chicago Stags in the dispersal draft.
The Philadelphia Warriors selected Andy Phillip from the Chicago Stags in the dispersal draft.

October 12, 1950
The Syracuse Nationals waived Ray Corley.

October 20, 1950
The Indianapolis Olympians selected Leo Barnhorst from the Chicago Stags in the dispersal draft. Barnhort was turned over to NBA after Chicago folded and sold to Indianapolis.

November 5, 1950
The Baltimore Bullets sold Harry Boykoff to the Boston Celtics.

November 22, 1950
The New York Knicks signed Tony Lavelli as a free agent.

November 29, 1950
The Baltimore Bullets claimed Gene James on waivers from the New York Knicks.
The Syracuse Nationals sold Ed Bartels to the Baltimore Bullets.
The Rochester Royals sold Ed Mikan to the Washington Capitols.
The Washington Capitols sold Don Otten to the Baltimore Bullets.

December 1, 1950
The Baltimore Bullets traded Dick Mehen to the Boston Celtics for Kenny Sailors and Brady Walker.

December 4, 1950
The Baltimore Bullets signed Don Carlson as a free agent.

December 8, 1950
The Fort Wayne Pistons sold John Hargis to the Tri-Cities Blackhawks.
The Baltimore Bullets sold Don Otten to the Fort Wayne Pistons.

December 10, 1950
The Syracuse Nationals sold Belus Smawley to the Baltimore Bullets.

December 11, 1950
The Minneapolis Lakers sold Ed Beach to the Tri-Cities Blackhawks.

December 13, 1950
The Tri-Cities Blackhawks traded Noble Jorgensen and cash to the Syracuse Nationals for Ed Peterson.

December 19, 1950
The Fort Wayne Pistons traded Bob Harris to the Boston Celtics for Dick Mehen.

January 9, 1951
The Baltimore Bullets selected Chick Halbert from the Washington Capitols in the dispersal draft.
The Fort Wayne Pistons selected Bill Sharman from the Washington Capitols in the dispersal draft.
The Minneapolis Lakers selected Dick Schnittker from the Washington Capitols in the dispersal draft.
The Syracuse Nationals selected Fred Scolari from the Washington Capitols in the dispersal draft.
The Boston Celtics selected Frank Kudelka from the Washington Capitols in the dispersal draft.
The Syracuse Nationals selected Earl Lloyd from the Washington Capitols in the dispersal draft.
The Boston Celtics selected Bones McKinney from the Washington Capitols in the dispersal draft.
The Tri-Cities Blackhawks selected Alan Sawyer from the Washington Capitols in the dispersal draft.

January 17, 1951
The Philadelphia Warriors signed Ed Mikan as a free agent.

January 18, 1951
The Baltimore Bullets fired Buddy Jeannette as head coach.
The Baltimore Bullets appointed Walt Budko as interim head coach.

February 3, 1951
The Tri-Cities Blackhawks traded Kleggie Hermsen to the Boston Celtics for Harry Boykoff.

February 12, 1951
The Syracuse Nationals sold Don Lofgran to the Indianapolis Olympians.
The Boston Celtics sold John Mahnken to the Indianapolis Olympians.

February 15, 1951
The Baltimore Bullets sold Ken Murray to the Fort Wayne Pistons.

February 22, 1951
Cliff Barker resigns as head coach for Indianapolis Olympians.
The Indianapolis Olympians appointed Wally Jones as interim head coach.

April 10, 1951
The Fort Wayne Pistons hired Paul Birch as head coach.

April 26, 1951
The Fort Wayne Pistons traded Bill Sharman to the Boston Celtics for Chuck Share. Some sources have Bob Brannum to Boston in this deal but he was already sold to them on September 23, 1950.

May 31, 1951
The Tri-Cities Blackhawks traded Frankie Brian to the Fort Wayne Pistons for Dick Mehen, Howie Schultz and cash.

June 30, 1951
The Indianapolis Olympians hired Herm Schaefer as head coach.

Notes
 Number of years played in the BAA prior to the draft
 Career with the franchise that drafted the player
 Never played a game for the franchise

External links
NBA Transactions at NBA.com
1950-51 NBA Transactions| Basketball-Reference.com

References

Transactions
1950-51